Gustave Cohen (24 December 1879 – 10 June 1958) was a French medievalist.

Cohen was born and grew up in Brussels. He fought for the French army in World War I. He became professor of medieval literature at the Sorbonne, encouraging his students to put on dramatic productions of medieval material. After the Vichy government forced him to resign in 1940, Cohen emigrated to the United States. In February 1942 he helped found the New York École libre des hautes études with Henri Focillon and Jacques Maritain. He established the Entretiens de Pontigny, symposiums of French cultural activity held at Mount Holyoke College in 1942, 1943 and 1944.

Publications 
 Histoire de la mise en scène dans le théâtre religieux français du Moyen Âge, H. Champion, 1906
 Rabelais et le théâtre, Champion, 1911
 Mystères et moralités du manuscrit 617 de Chantilly, Champion, 1920
 Écrivains français en Hollande dans la première moitié du XVIIe siècle, Champion, 1921
 Ronsard, sa vie et son œuvre, Boivin, 1924
 Le livre de conduite du régisseur et le compte des dépenses pour le Mystère de la Passion joué à Mons en 1501, Strasbourg, 1925
 Le Théâtre en France au Moyen Âge, Rieder, 1928-1931
 La Comédie latine en France au XIIe siècle, Les Belles Lettres, 1931
 Un Grand Romancier d'amour et d'aventure du XIIe siècle : Chrétien de Troyes et son œuvre, Boivin, Paris, 1931
 Le Champfleury de Geoffroy Tory, Charles Bosse, 1932
 Essai d'explication du Cimetière marin, Gallimard, 1933
 Le Miracle de Théophile, Delagrave, 1933
 Le Jeu d'Adam et Ève', Delagrave, 1935 
 Le Jeu de Robin et Marion, Delagrave, 1935
 Lettres aux Américains, Montréal, Éditions de l'arbre, 1942
 Anthologie de la littérature française au Moyen Âge, Delagrave, 1946
 La Grande Clarté du Moyen Âge, New York, Maison française d'édition, 1943
 Ceux que j'ai connus, Montréal, Éditions de l'arbre, 1946
 Le Théâtre français en Belgique au Moyen Âge'', La Renaissance du Livre, Bruxelles, 1953

References

External links 
 Entretiens de Pontigny Collection at Mount Holyoke College
 The Pontigny Colloquia. Artists, Intellectuals, and World War II  at Mount Holyoke College

1879 births
1958 deaths
French medievalists
19th-century French Jews
People from Saint-Josse-ten-Noode
20th-century French historians
Corresponding Fellows of the Medieval Academy of America